Oscar Méténier (17 January 1859 – 9 February 1913) was a French playwright and novelist. In 1897 he founded Le Théâtre du Grand-Guignol in Paris, planning it as a space for naturalist performance.

Life
Born in Sancoins, Cher, the son of a police commissioner, Oscar Méténier at first followed his father into the police, as secretary to the commissariat of la Tour Saint-Jacques, in which role he was able to observe the morals of low-life Paris, for which he had a near-scientific interest and eye.  Laurent Tailhade wrote of him:

A follower of Émile Zola, Méténier wrote naturalist novellas, generally gravelly in style, and pieces in argot for Le Chat Noir. He made his reputation with naturalist plays set among vagabonds, Apaches and prostitutes and expressed in the language of the street.  In 1896 his Mademoiselle Fifi, previously temporarily banned by the police, was the first ever French play to include a prostitute character. The following year, Méténier's Lui ! showed a meeting between a murderer and a prostitute in a hotel bedroom.

In 1897, Oscar Méténier bought a theatre at the end of the impasse Chaptal (9th arrondissement) to present his own plays.  This was the Théâtre du Grand-Guignol, one of the most original theatres in Paris, and he remained its director until 1898.

Works

Plays

 En famille, 1-act prose comedy, Paris, Théâtre-Libre, 30 May 1887
 La Puissance des Ténèbres, drama in six acts by Leo Tolstoy, French translation by Pavlovsky and Oscar Méténier, Paris, Théâtre-Libre, 10 February 1888
 La Casserole, 1-act prose drama, Paris, Théâtre-Libre, 31 May 1889
 Les Frères Zemganno, 3-act prose play, after Edmond and Jules de Goncourt, written in collaboration with Paul Alexis, Paris, Théâtre-Libre, 25 February 1890
 Monsieur Betsy, 4-act prose comedy, written in collaboration with Paul Alexis, Paris, Théâtre des Variétés, 3 March 1890
 La Confrontation, dramatic scene, Paris, Théâtre de la Scala, 21 December 1891
 La bonne à tout faire, 4-act prose comedy, in collaboration with Jean-Louis Dubut de Laforest, Paris, Théâtre des Variétés, 20 February 1892
 Rabelais, 4-act, 5-scene play, with Jean-Louis Dubut de Laforest, Paris, Nouveau-Théâtre, 25 October 1892
 Charles Demailly, 4-act prose play, after Edmond and Jules de Goncourt, in collaboration with Paul Alexis, Paris, Théâtre du Gymnase, 19 December 1892 (Summary by Willy and Edmond de Goncourt)
 Très Russe, 3-act play, in collaboration with Jean Lorrain, Paris, Théâtre-d'application (La Bodinière), 3 May 1893
 Mademoiselle Fifi, drama, after Guy de Maupassant's short story of the same name, Paris, Théâtre-Libre, 10 February 1896
 La Brême, mœurs populaires, drama, Paris, Théâtre du Grand-Guignol, 13 April 1897
 Le Loupiot, tableau de mœurs populaires, en 2 scènes, Paris, Théâtre du Grand-Guignol, 13 avril 1897
 Lui !, 1-act drama, Paris, Théâtre du Grand-Guignol, 11 November 1897
 La Revanche de Dupont l'Anguille, drame en 3 tableaux, Paris, Théâtre du Grand-Guignol, 1898
 Son poteau, drama, in collaboration with Raoul Ralph, Paris, Théâtre du Grand-Guignol, 10 April 1901
 Boule de suif, 3 act, 4 scene comedy, in collaboration with Guy de Maupassant, Paris, Théâtre Antoine, 6 May 1902 
 Casque d'Or, drama, in collaboration with Fabrice Delphi, Paris, Théâtre Robinière, 16 March 1902
 Notre-Dame de la Butte, mœurs montmartroises, drama, in collaboration with Fabrice Delphi, 1907
 Madame ma sœur, 1-act play, 1910
 La Moukère, 1-act drama, in collaboration with René Mélinette, 1910
 Royal-cambouis, 1-act military play, Paris, Scala, 1910

Novels, novellas, essays
 La Chair (1885)
 La Grâce (1886)
 Madame Berwick  (1888)
 Outre-Rhin  (1888)
 Mynha-Maria  (1889)
 Autour de la caserne, novellas (1890)
 Madame la Boule  (1890)
 Le mari de Berthe  (1890)
 Le Gorille, Parisian novel (1891) Text on www.gutenberg.org
 La Lutte pour l'amour, études d'argot  (1891)
 Les Voyous au théâtre  (1891)
 Zézette, mœurs foraines, novel (1891) Text on www.gutenberg.org
 Les Cabots  (1892)
 Le Policier, roman
 Barbe-Bleue  (1893)
 Le Beau monde  (1893)
 Le Chansonnier populaire Aristide Bruant  (1893)
 La Nymphomane, mœurs parisiennes  (1893)
 Demi-castors (mœurs parisiennes)  (1894)
 La Grâce. Décadence. Nostalgie  (1894)
 La Vie de campagne. Marcelle  (1894)
 Le 40e d'artillerie. Les bêtes. Les hommes. La croix, novellas (1895)
 L'Amour vaincu. Bohème galante, bohème bourgeoise, novellas (1896)
 L'amour qui tue  (1898)
 Reines de cœur, mœurs d'Outre-Rhin  (1900-1910)
 Les Berlinois chez eux, vertus et vices allemands  (1904)
 Une gamine vicieuse  (1905)
 Le jeune télégraphiste  (1905)
 Tartufes et satyres, unedited epic-dramatic novel (1905), which he wanted to form "a veritable encyclopaedia of the human passions" and was to have comprised : 1) Le marché aux vierges, 2) Le miroir à gigolettes, 3) Berlingot-la-Vache, 4) Les satyres en famille, 5) Les tricheuses de l'amour, 6) La môme claque-dents, 7) Le charcutier parfumé, etc.
 Les Amoureux de Mira, Parisian novel (1907)
 Nina Sartorelle : mœurs parisiennes (1907)
 Les Baronnes de Roche-Noire  (1908)
 Reine de cœur (1908)
 Notre-Dame de la Butte (1908)
 La dernière aventure du Prince Curaçao (1910)
 Les méprises du cœur (1910)
 Soldes de contes (1911)
 Le grand chéri (1911)

External links
 Laurent Tailhade, Text on Oscar Méténier
 
 

1859 births
1913 deaths
People from Cher (department)
19th-century French dramatists and playwrights
20th-century French dramatists and playwrights
19th-century French novelists
20th-century French novelists